Stephan P. Mickle (June 18, 1944 – January 26, 2021) was a United States district judge of the United States District Court for the Northern District of Florida.

Education

Mickle was born in New York City, New York. In 1965, he received his Bachelor of Arts degree in political science. He was the first Black undergraduate student to graduate from the University of Florida. In 1966, he received his Master of Education from the University of Florida. Additionally, he received his Juris Doctor from the Fredric G. Levin College of Law at the University of Florida in 1970. He was the second Black student to graduate from the University of Florida Fredric G. Levin College of Law.

Career

Mickle worked briefly as an attorney in the Office of Legal Services at the Equal Employment Opportunity Commission in Washington, D.C. in 1970 and in private practice in Fort Lauderdale, Florida. He returned to Gainesville in 1971, when he became an adjunct professor at the University of Florida College of Law, a post he still held, and entered private practice as the first Black lawyer in Alachua County. Mickle was also a special assistant public defender for the Eighth Judicial Circuit in 1974. Mickle was a judge on the Alachua County Court from 1979 to 1984 and was a circuit judge in Florida's Eighth Judicial Circuit from 1984 to 1992. He served as a judge of the Florida First District Court of Appeal from 1993 to 1998.

Federal judicial service

President Bill Clinton nominated Mickle to the United States District Court for the Northern District of Florida on January 27, 1998, to the seat vacated by Maurice M. Paul. Confirmed by the Senate on May 14, 1998, he received commission on May 22, 1998. He served as Chief Judge from 2009 to 2011. He assumed senior status on June 22, 2011. He died on January 26, 2021.

Honors

Mickle was the first Black man to receive the University of Florida's Distinguished Alumnus Award, in 1999. In January 2022, the Alachua County criminal courthouse was renamed for the late Judge, as the Judge Stephen P. Mickle, Sr. Courthouse.

See also 
 List of African-American federal judges
 List of African-American jurists

References

Sources

1944 births
2021 deaths
University of Florida alumni
Judges of the United States District Court for the Northern District of Florida
United States district court judges appointed by Bill Clinton
Judges of the Florida District Courts of Appeal
African-American judges
Public defenders
Lawyers from New York City
Florida state court judges
20th-century American judges
Fredric G. Levin College of Law alumni
21st-century American judges
21st-century African-American people